Dmitriy Andreyevich Sorokin (Дмитрий Андреевич Сорокин; born 27 September 1992 in Khabarovsk) is a Russian athlete specialising in the triple jump. He represented his country at the 2015 World Championships finishing seventh. In addition, he won the gold medal at the 2015 Summer Universiade.

His personal bests in the event are 17.29 metres outdoors (+0.2 m/s, Gwangju 2015) and 16.94 metres indoors (Moscow 2015).

Doping ban
In May 2011 Sorokin tested positive for the stimulant Carphedon and was subsequently handed a 2-year ban from sports. The ban ended 26 May 2013.

Competition record

References

1992 births
Living people
Sportspeople from Khabarovsk
Russian male triple jumpers
Universiade gold medalists in athletics (track and field)
Universiade gold medalists for Russia
Medalists at the 2015 Summer Universiade
World Athletics Championships athletes for Russia
Authorised Neutral Athletes at the World Athletics Championships
Russian Athletics Championships winners
Doping cases in athletics
Russian sportspeople in doping cases